École Nationale Supérieure de l'Électronique et de ses Applications (also known as ENSEA) is a graduate school (grande école) of electrical engineering and computer science, located in Cergy (in Val d'Oise department) close to Paris in France.

It was founded in 1952 under the name of ENREA and became ENSEA in 1976.

Admissions
Future engineers are recruited after a centralized and selective country-wide specific entrance examination ("Classes Préparatoires") or laterally into final or pre-final year after a bachelor's degree in electronics or relevant scientific fields (physics, chemistry, electronics, computer science, etc.).

Programs

Grande École Degree 
The Engineering degree (or Diplôme d'Ingénieur de l'École Nationale Supérieure de l'Electronique et de ses Applications) delivered by L'Académie de Versailles; is equivalent to the master's degree in engineering in the United States. Courses spread over three years cover all aspects of electrical, electronics and computer science and engineering, e.g.: signal processing, microelectronics, embedded systems, software engineering, networking, control and power electronics besides some important non-engineering courses such as economics, management, business communications and foreign languages.

M.S. Specialized Masters Programs
ENSEA and ITIN offer also an MS Specialized Master labelled by the Conférence des grandes écoles and named TIM (Mobile IT and Telecommunication)

Specialisations
The school presently offers 8 specialisations:
1-Electronics, Communications & Microwaves
2-Networks and Telecommunications
3-Embedded Electronic Systems
4-Mechatronics and Complex Systems
5-Electronics, Instrumentation and Bioscience
6-Control Systems & Power Electronics
7-Computer Systems
8-Multimedia Systems

International orientation
The school has international links with universities from all over the world, especially in the United States, Germany, Spain and UK. It has dual master's degrees with several American and European universities including Technical University of Munich, Imperial College, Georgia Tech, Illinois Institute of Technology and Suny Buffalo. 
ENSEA is also a member of the n+i network of engineering schools and admits 10 students from around the world every year through the N+i program.

Research pole 
ENSEA as well as all upper education institutions of Cergy-Pontoise are organized in a PRES (Research and Upper Education Pole) including :
 Cergy-Pontoise University
 CY Tech
 groupe ESSEC
 ENSEA, École Nationale Supérieure de l'Électronique et de ses Applications
 ITIN, Ecole supérieure d’Informatique, Réseaux et Systèmes d’Information
 ENSAPC, École nationale supérieure d'arts de Cergy-Pontoise
 EBI (École de Biologie Industrielle)
 EPMI ( École d'électricité, de Production et des Méthodes Industrielles)
 EPSS (École Pratique de Service Social)
 ESCOM (École supérieure de chimie organique et minérale)
 ILEPS (Institut Libre d’Éducation Physique Supérieur)
 ISTOM (Institut Supérieur d’agro-développement)
 ESCIA, École supérieure de comptabilité, gestion et finance

Alumni 
Since its founding in 1952, ENSEA has produced more than 7600 graduates.

 Thierry Boisnon – Country Senior Officer of Nokia France and Vice President Strategy & Portfolio Nokia Services of Nokia Group
 Pierre-Emmanuel Calmel – CoFounder and CTO of Devialet 
 Christophe Duhamel – CoFounder and CEO of Marmiton.org 
 Arnaud Fleurent-Didier – French singer
 Christophe Gourlay – Chief Purchasing Officer of Alstom
 Frank Terner – ex-CEO of Air France.

References

External links
  Official web site
  Official web site

Cergy
Educational institutions established in 1952
1952 establishments in France